Nevinville is an unincorporated community in Adams County, Iowa, United States.

History
Nevinville was founded in 1856. It was named for Rev. Edwin H. Nevin.

References

Unincorporated communities in Adams County, Iowa
1856 establishments in Iowa
Populated places established in 1856
Unincorporated communities in Iowa